Khamcha-i is a district (amphoe) of Mukdahan province, northeastern Thailand.

Geography
Neighboring districts are (from the north clockwise) Dong Luang, Mueang Mukdahan, and Nong Sung of Mukdahan Province; Kuchinarai and Khao Wong of Kalasin province.

History
The minor district (king amphoe) was created on 24 June 1941, when the six tambons Khamcha-i, Nong Sung, Ban Song, Ban Kho, Ban Lao, and Nong Ian were split off from Mukdahan District. Originally the district office was in Khamcha-i Sub-district, but in 1949 it was moved to Ban Song Sub-district. In 1956 the minor district was upgraded to a full district. In 1982 it was one of the districts which formed then new province Mukdahan.

Administration 
The district is divided into nine sub-districts (tambons), which are further subdivided into 87 villages (muban). Khamcha-i is a sub-district municipality (thesaban tambon), which covers parts of tambon Nam Thiang. There are a further nine tambon administrative organizations (TAO).

Missing numbers are tambon which now form Nong Sung District.

References

External links
amphoe.com

Khamcha-i